Fabian Wetter (born 30 March 1989) in Lübbecke is a German footballer who plays for Holstein Kiel.

External links

1989 births
Living people
German footballers
Holstein Kiel players
3. Liga players
Association football fullbacks
TSV Havelse players
Holstein Kiel II players